Fancourt Hotel and Country Club is golf estate in George, Western Cape, South Africa. It is rated among the top 10 lifestyle estates in the world.

The Links Course at Fancourt is rated as the number 1 golf course in South Africa by Golf Digest.

Fancourt hosted the 2003 Presidents Cup, the only time the event has ended in a tie.

It also hosted the 2005 Women's World Cup of Golf as well as the Coca-Cola Charity Championship  on the Sunshine Tour.

References

External links

Golf clubs and courses in South Africa
1989 establishments in South Africa